Achille Van Acker (8 April 1898 – 10 July 1975) was a Belgian politician who served three terms as the prime minister of Belgium between 1946 and 1958. A moderate from Flanders, Van Acker was a member of the Belgian Socialist Party (PSB–BSP) and played an important role in the creation of the Belgian welfare state after World War II.

Biography

Early life
Achille Honoré Van Acker was born into a working class family in Bruges, Belgium in 1898 as the youngest of 12 children. He only attended school until the age of 11. Despite entering the workforce, Van Acker read widely and joined several social associations in Bruges. At the outbreak of World War I, he was refused by the Belgian Army because he suffered from astigmatism. While the Germans occupied most of Belgium, Van Acker fled into the small section of unoccupied territory behind the Yser Front where he worked in various menial capacities. Mixing with Belgian soldiers during the war, Van Acker became involved in socialist politics, developing a distinctive ideology based on moderate social democracy. After the end of the war, he returned to Bruges and joined the Belgian Labour Party (Belgische Werkliedenpartij, POB–BWP) and became active in socialist groups, trade unions, and cooperatives.

In 1926, Van Acker was elected to a position in Bruges' city council and, in 1927, became a POB–BWP member of the Chamber of Representatives aged 29. In his early years in parliament, Van Acker developed particular expertise in social security legislation.

In May 1940, Belgium was invaded by Nazi Germany. Following the Belgian surrender and the start of the German occupation, the head of the POB–BWP Henri de Man announced the dissolution of the socialist party as part of a policy of collaborationism. Van Acker retreated from public life. In 1941, however, he rejoined the illegal socialist party and underground trade union movement under the nom de guerre "Monsieur André" and travelled around the country making contact with party sections. At the Liberation of Belgium in September 1944, Van Acker emerged as the head of the POB–BWP's successor party, the Belgian Socialist Party (Belgische Socialistische Partij, PSB-BSP).

In December 1944, while serving as a government minister, Van Acker implemented Belgium's social security system.

Prime Minister 
After the Second World War, Van Acker became Prime Minister of Belgium in four different cabinets and served as Minister of Labour and Social Services, Minister of Public Health, Minister of Mobility and Minister of Mining (which led to his nickname). From 1961 until 1974 he served as President of the Chamber of Representatives. He was named Minister of State in 1958. During Van Acker's first premiership, compulsory disability insurance and compulsory health insurance for manual and non-manual workers was introduced in March 1945 and from January 1946 onwards health insurance funds earmarked a special contribution that covered the costs of preventive open-air cures. To improve health and safety in mines, a decree was introduced in December 1945 provididing for the compulsory use in dusty places of devices “capable of allaying or suppressing coal and stone dust.” A number of laws were also passed from April 1945 onwards that liberalized entitlement to allowances for deportees of foreign nationality.

An Order of October 1945 issued general regulations for the medical control of workers in industrial and commercial undertakings, public services and public utilities. Another order introduced that same month issued general regulations concerning personal equipment for health protection. Following a 1940 law that enabled homeowners wishing to begin reconstruction of their properties to apply for a “repair loan at a low rate of interest, an Act was passed in December 1945 that enabled them to acquire an interest-free advance on their compensation. That same month, a Supreme Council for Hygiene in Mines was established with the aim of furthering the progress of industrial hygiene. In February 1946, the formation of safety and hygiene committees was made compulsory. Titles I and II of general regulations for the protection of labour, dated 11 February 1946, “which constitute a codification of the Belgian labour protection legislation, were approved by an Order of the Regent on 11 February 1946.” In September 1945, workers’ compensation was extended to household maids, and for accidents to and from work in December 1945.  A Legislative Order of January 1946 regulating annual holidays covered all persons “bound by contracts for the hiring of services or by contracts of apprenticeship,” and laid down the essential principles for the grant of paid holidays, “leaving scope for their adaptation to the special needs of the various branches of industrial activity.”

The first three cabinets led by Van Acker were short-lived because of the crisis pertaining to Leopold III which held Belgium in its grip from 1944 to 1951.

Initiatives were taken by Van Acker's fourth cabinet to expand social spending on pensions, housing, employment, and education. Steps were also taken to reduce the workweek and to reduce the term of compulsory military service from 21 to 18 months. A 45-hour workweek was introduced in 1955, and a law was passed in 1956 that doubled holiday leave entitlement from 6 to 12 days. Earnings-related pension schemes were introduced for manual workers (1955), seamen (1956), and white-collar workers (1957). Allowances were introduced in 1955 to cover demolition and rehousing while pension contributions were made obligatory in 1956. An Act of June 1954 increased the minimum pension and introduced index-lining of for pension benefits, while an Act of July 1957 introduced a wage-related pension formula for white-collar workers. Under the 1955 Collard Act, municipalities could admit private schools only “after they had created public-sector ones and only where there a need for them was felt.” New schools were also built, and in the 1956 budget, provision was made (for the first time) the purchase by the state of school supplies for “the benefit of pupils in primary and nursery-infant sections attached to state secondary education establishments." In addition, a law of March 1958 made public authorities responsible for the cost of transporting (where necessary) abnormal and similarly handicapped children to special schools.

Altogether, the various social reforms realised under Van Acker's fourth cabinet led him to be known as the father of Belgian social security.

Later life and death 
Van Acker died on 11 July 1975, at the age of 77.

Authography
Moederweelde (Bruges, 1926).
Drie Sterren (Bruges, 1962).
Puntdichten en Grafschriften (Tielt, 1968).

Honours 
 Belgium: Minister of state, By royal decree of 23 December 1958.
 Belgium: Grand Cordon in the Order of Leopold.
 Belgium: Knight Grand cross in the Order of the Crown.
 Belgium: Knight in the Order of Leopold II.
 Knight Grand cross in the Order of Orange-Nassau.
 Knight Grand cross in the Legion of Honour.
 Knight Grand cross in the Order of the Oak Crown.
 Knight Grand cross in the Order of the White Rose of Finland.

References

Bibliography

External links

 
 Why April 11, 1954 Is Statistically The Most Boring Day Ever Video that mentions Van Acker's 1954 election to Prime Minister as probably the most important event that happened that day.

|-

|-

|-

1898 births
1975 deaths
Belgian Ministers of State
Belgian Socialist Party politicians
Politicians from Bruges
Presidents of the Chamber of Representatives (Belgium)
Prime Ministers of Belgium

Grand Crosses of the Order of the Crown (Belgium)
Grand Crosses 1st class of the Order of Merit of the Federal Republic of Germany